is a Japanese professional sumo wrestler from Fukushima. He wrestles for the Arashio stable, where he is a stable mate of his brothers Wakatakakage and Wakatakamoto. His highest rank to date has been komusubi.

Career
Wakamotoharu comes from a sumo family. His grandfather Wakabayama reached the komusubi rank, his father was a makushita division wrestler, and he has an elder brother Wakatakamoto and a younger brother Wakatakakage who are also sumo wrestlers at the same stable. Wakatakamoto has yet to progress beyond the makushita division, but Wakatakakage surpassed his grandfather's achievements by reaching the rank of sekiwake in 2022. Their current shikona come from a well-known parable about three brothers by the 16th-century warlord Mōri Motonari.

Wakamotoharu made his professional debut in November 2011 under the shikona of Araonami. In his first official tournament in January 2012, under the new name of Goshi, he won the jonokuchi championship or yūshō with a perfect 7–0 record. In May 2017 he adopted the shikona of Wakamotoharu. In January 2019 he won the makushita division championship with an undefeated 7–0 score and was promoted to the jūryō division. He scored only five wins in his jūryō debut and was demoted, but returned to jūryō after a 6–1 record at makushita 1 in September 2019.

In November 2019 he had to apologize after a picture of him bound and gagged with tape was posted on social media by fellow wrestler Abi. The prank was criticized for seeming to make light of past incidents of violence within sumo stables, and the Japan Sumo Association responded by banning sumo wrestlers from having individual social media accounts.
 
In December 2021 the Japan Sumo Association released the rankings for the January 2022 tournament, and he was promoted to the top makuuchi division, joining his younger brother Wakatakakage. Wakamotoharu and Wakatakakage are the 12th pair of brothers to both be ranked in the top division at the same time. He is the second member of Arashio stable to make the top division following Wakatakakage in November 2019, and the first since the current stablemaster, former maegashira Sōkokurai, took over. Speaking to reporters Wakamotoharu recalled the difficulty of beginning 2021 by having to sit out the January tournament because of a COVID-19 infection but ending it with his best result as a sekitori, an 11-4 record in November, which saw him win promotion. He said that he hoped he would be able to outdo his younger brother.

In the January 2022 tournament Wakamotoharu secured a winning record in his makuuchi debut on Day 14 when he defeated Tobizaru. His second straight winning record came on Day 12 of the March 2022 tournament, when he defeated Endō to move to 8–4. He finished the tournament with another 9–6 record.

Wakamotoharu's bout against Terunofuji in the July 2022 tournament was stopped after two minutes by gyoji Shikimori Inosuke after Wakamotoharu's mawashi became undone. After a pause of about ten minutes for a mono-ii and to reset the positions of the wrestlers, Wakamotoharu was defeated when Terunofuji quickly swung him out of the ring with an underarm throw.

After 2 consecutive 10-5 winning records in the top maegashira ranks, Wakamotoharu was promoted to komusubi for the January 2023 tournament. He secured a winning record in his sanyaku debut on the 14th day. He retained his komusubi ranking in the March banzuke.

Fighting style
Wakamotoharu prefers to grab his opponent's mawashi rather than push or thrust, and his favourite grip is hidari-yotsu, with his right hand outside and left hand inside his opponent's arms. His most common winning kimarite or technique is a straightforward yori-kiri, or force out.

Personal life
Wakamotoharu announced after his makuuchi promotion that he had got married in November 2021, after a three-year relationship.

Career record

See also
List of active sumo wrestlers
List of komusubi

References

External links
 
 Wakamotoharu profile at the Arashio stable official website

1993 births
Living people
Japanese sumo wrestlers
Sumo people from Fukushima Prefecture
Komusubi